Eugene or Gene Klein may refer to:

 Gene Klein (1921–1990), American entrepreneur and sportsman
 Gene Klein (soccer), American soccer coach
 Eugene Klein (philatelist) (1878–1944), American stamp collector
 Gene Simmons (born 1949), aka Gene Klein, American rock musician
 Eugene Klein, American cellist with the Delaware Symphony Orchestra

See also
 Jean Klein (disambiguation)
 Gene Clines, American baseball player